"Seven Days in Sunny June" is the second single from British funk and acid jazz band Jamiroquai's sixth studio album, Dynamite (2005). Written by lead singer Jay Kay and new keyboardist Matt Johnson, the track is considered to be a throwback to the old acid jazz sound upon which Jamiroquai made their name. The song peaked at number 14 on the UK Singles Chart.

Music video
The video features the band having a pool party in a garden, where they do random things such as playing with a beach ball, riding minibikes, throwing confetti, as well as having ketchup lowered from a helicopter, as Jay Kay sings the lyrics. However, the word "bomb" in "drop the bomb on me" is cut out, as it—alongside the radio edit—released a month after the 7/7 terrorist attacks in London. Kay changes his clothing seven times, representing the 7 days of the week, with one of the garments being a Peru-national-football-team-inspired jacket. The video ends with Kay on the ground, laughing.

Track listings
UK CD1
 "Seven Days in Sunny June"
 "Seven Days in Sunny June" (Steve Mac Classic Remix)

UK CD2 & Australian CD single
 "Seven Days in Sunny June"
 "Seven Days in Sunny June" (Steve Mac Classic Remix)
 "Seven Days in Sunny June" (Oliver Lang remix)
 "Seven Days in Sunny June" (Blackbeard remix)

Charts

Release history

References

2005 singles
2005 songs
Jamiroquai songs
Songs written by Jason Kay
Songs written by Matt Johnson (keyboardist)